Zhang Jiawei (Jan 8 1989 ) is a Chinese boxer who took the silver medal in the flyweight division at the Asian Games in 2010. He won the Bocskai Memorial Tournament in 2010.

References

1989 births
Living people
People from Fujian
Sportspeople from Fujian
People from Ningde
Asian Games medalists in boxing
Boxers at the 2010 Asian Games
Boxers at the 2014 Asian Games
Chinese male boxers
Olympic boxers of China
Boxers at the 2016 Summer Olympics
Asian Games silver medalists for China
Medalists at the 2010 Asian Games
Medalists at the 2014 Asian Games
Bantamweight boxers
Flyweight boxers
21st-century Chinese people